King Memorial is an elevated train station in Atlanta, Georgia, serving the Blue and Green Lines of the Metropolitan Atlanta Rapid Transit Authority (MARTA) rail system. It is named for Martin Luther King Jr. whose church and burial place are nearby. It mainly serves the Sweet Auburn Historic District as well as the communities surrounding Oakland Cemetery. Bus Service Provided to: Zoo Atlanta, Grant Park, Ansley Mall, Piedmont Park, Atlanta Medical Center, Grady Memorial Hospital, South Dekalb Mall and Ponce City Market.

On weekends, the Green Line terminates at this station rather than continuing to Edgewood/Candler Park station two stops to the east.

Station layout

Buses at this station
The station is served by the following MARTA bus routes:
 Route 9 - Boulevard / Tilson Road / Rainbow Way.
 Route 809 - Monroe Drive / Boulevard
 Route 899 - Old Fourth Ward./Boulevard

References

External links 

MARTA Station Page
King Memorial Station Guide
nycsubway.org Atlanta page
 Decatur Street entrance from Google Maps Street View

Blue Line (MARTA)
Green Line (MARTA)
Metropolitan Atlanta Rapid Transit Authority stations
Railway stations in the United States opened in 1979
Railway stations in Atlanta
1979 establishments in Georgia (U.S. state)
Old Fourth Ward